Seat can refer to:

A place to sit (a "seat"), particularly the area one sits upon (rather than other elements, like armrests). It derives from Middle English sete and from Old Norse sæti.

See:
 Chair
 Car seat
 Infant car seat, for children in a car
 Airline seat
 Ejection seat, rescue seat in an aircraft
 Jump seat, auxiliary seat in a vehicle
 Right seat, co-pilot's seat
 Saddle, a type of seat used on the backs of animals, bicycles (see bicycle seat), etc.
 Buttocks, the part of the body on which one sits

A place or office of authority. This meaning derives from the Latin word situs, a place.

See:
 Chair (official), a seat of office, authority, or dignity
 the family seat of a noble family, sometimes referred to as an ancestral seat
the cathedra of a bishop
 Legislative seat, a membership in a parliament or other legislature
 Seat (legal entity), indicating where the headquarters of the entity are located
 Seat of government, the building(s) or city from which a government exercises its authority
 An administrative centre, the capital city of an administrative region, such as:
 County seat
 Canton seat
 Clan seat
 Country seat, a place in the country
 Throne, the original seat of authority from which others may be derived
 Seat (territorial-administrative unit), territorial-administrative unit in the medieval Hungarian Kingdom

Other
 SEAT, a Spanish car manufacturer, originally a state-owned company but currently owned by the Volkswagen Group
 S.E.A.T. (Sociedad Española de Automóviles y Transportes), a company that sold the French car brand Rebour in Catalonia in the early 20th century
 Seat (Buttermere), a fell in the Lake District, Cumbria, England
 Southeast Area Transit, a bus agency in Connecticut
 Single Engine Air Tanker, a type of aircraft
 Seat, a proper name used for the star Pi Aquarii

See also
Seating assignment
Seating capacity